Nevsky (masculine), Nevskaya (feminine), or Nevskoye (neuter) may refer to:

People
Alexander Nevsky (1220–1263), Russian historical icon and patron saint of Saint Petersburg
Alex Nevsky (musician) (born 1986), French-Canadian singer
Nikolai Aleksandrovich Nevsky (1892–1937), Russian linguist, executed and later rehabilitated by the Soviet Union
Olga Nevskaya, second wife of Savik Shuster, Ukrainian journalist
Vladimir Nevsky, Bolshevik activist
Dina Nevskaya, fictional character played by Tara Reid in the 2005 movie Silent Partner

Places
Alexander Nevsky Bridge in Saint Petersburg
Alexander Nevsky Cathedrals, list of cathedrals and churches named after Alexander Nevsky
Alexander Nevsky Lavra or Monastery, founded by Peter the Great in 1710 in Saint Petersburg
Gora Nevskaya, highest point of the Kolyma Mountains, Magadan Oblast, Russia
Nevsky District, district of Saint Petersburg, Russia
Nevsky Prospekt (Saint Petersburg Metro), station on the Moskovsko-Petrogradskaya Line of the Saint Petersburg Metro
Nevsky Pyatachok, the name of the Neva Bridgehead southeast Saint Petersburg
Nevskoye Microdistrict, a part of Kaliningrad, Russia

In arts and entertainment
Alexander Nevsky (film), a 1938 historical drama based on the life of Alexander Nevsky
Alexander Nevsky (Prokofiev), the score for the 1938 film and a cantata derived from the score, composed by Sergei Prokofiev
Life of Alexander Nevsky, a Russian literary monument of the late 13th – early 14th centuries
Life of Alexander Nevsky (illuminated manuscript), a Russian illuminated manuscript of the late 16th century
Nevsky Prospekt (story), a short story by Nikolai Gogol, published in 1835
Nevsky String Quartet, based in Saint Petersburg

Other uses
Order of Saint Alexander Nevsky, first instituted in 1725 by Catherine I of Russia
Order of Alexander Nevsky, established by the Soviet Union to replace the Order of Saint Alexander Nevsky
Russian frigate Alexander Nevsky, a large screw frigate of the Russian Imperial Navy
Russian submarine Alexander Nevsky, a Russian nuclear submarine of the fourth-generation Borei class

See also 
Aleksandr Nevskiy (athlete) (born 1958), Russian decathlete